LNER Class P2 No. 2007 Prince of Wales is a 2-8-2 "Mikado" steam locomotive being built at Darlington Locomotive Works, England, and managed by the A1 Steam Locomotive Trust. It will be the seventh member of its class and the only P2 in existence; the original six were built between 1934 and 1936 for the London and North Eastern Railway (LNER) to a design by Nigel Gresley, and employed to haul heavy passenger trains on the Edinburgh to Aberdeen line. The P2s were declared Britain's most powerful express passenger engines, although none were preserved.

The A1 Trust announced the project in 2013, following the completion and success of its first new build locomotive, LNER Peppercorn Class A1 No. 60163 Tornado, in 2008. Construction on Prince of Wales began in 2014 with its design based on P2 No. 2001 Cock o' the North with some modifications to improve maintenance, address historic problems, and comply with modern railway operations. It is expected to be complete in 2023 at an estimated cost of £5 million, after which it will run on the mainline and heritage railways.

Background 

The original six Class P2 locomotives (Nos. 2001 to 2006) were built at Doncaster Works between 1934 and 1936 to a design by chief mechanical engineer Nigel Gresley. They were employed to haul express trains over the Edinburgh to Aberdeen line of the London and North Eastern Railway (LNER) and were the most powerful in Great Britain, capable of hauling 600-ton trains. However, restrictions brought on by World War II caused them to suffer mechanical problems during the 1940s, which contributed to the decision to rebuild the class into LNER Thompson Class A2/2s by Gresley's successor, Edward Thompson. The rebuilt engines were withdrawn between 1959 and 1961, and none survived into preservation.

In 2008, the A1 Steam Locomotive Trust completed its first new build steam locomotive project, the LNER Peppercorn Class A1 No. 60163 Tornado, which marked the first British mainline steam engine built since 1960. The success of Tornado gave the A1 Trust the opportunity to look into a second new build project. In December 2010, it announced its intention to conduct a feasibility study into building a seventh Class P2, the most frequently requested engine. The study included the examination of commercial, engineering, and certification challenges that may arise and discussions amongst the trust and regulatory bodies were "very positive". A 3D computer model of the P2 was created using original drawings kept in the National Railway Museum and used for track dynamic analysis using Tornado as the basis and track position data from Network Rail to validate the modelling data.
 
The project officially launched in September 2013. On 14 November, the A1 Trust announced that No. 2007 would be named Prince of Wales, which was Prince Charles' 65th birthday. Despite Charles ascending to the throne in September 2022, the engine's name will not change.

Design 
Prince of Wales, like Tornado, will be built as a new member of its class rather than a replica. Its design is based on the original drawings of P2 No. 2001 Cock o' the North, but with extensive alterations to improve maintenance, lower life-cycle costs, address historic problems, and comply with modern operating requirements and standards. Modifications include roller bearings, an all-welded, all-steel boiler and Lentz poppet valve gear. The external appearance will match Cock o' the North in its original configuration before it was streamlined. Components in common with Tornado have been incorporated into Prince of Wales as a cost-saving measure. The A1 Trust estimates both locomotives will have about 70% of their parts in common, including the boiler and tender.

A1 Trust director of engineering David Elliott observed that the original P2s had several shortcomings, difficulties when traversing tight curves, and being prone to crank axle failures but was confident that these will be resolved by contemporary engineering techniques. The curve problem was studied using Resonate Group's Vampire software to simulate the vehicle's rail dynamics. The simulation determined optimal coupled wheelset clearances and design of a pony truck with side-spring control.

To retain the same power output as the P2s, the boiler operates at 250 psi instead of 220 psi. Because of improved heat treatment methods and modern tooling, a durable infinitely-variable cam can be used instead of the stepped cam adopted for the early P2s, enabling greater efficiency. Prince of Wales boiler is  shorter than the original, and the smokebox is 17 inches longer. The change was made because the extra boiler length failed to raise extra steam as firebox gases cooled towards its far end and the longer smokebox will provide a larger vacuum reservoir to smooth exhaust pulses. The boiler is based on Tornado's as is the complex superheater header and electrical system. The sloped smokebox meant that the chimney on Prince of Wales required a unique casting.

Manufacture 
A Solidworks computer aided design (CAD) model was created for use in the manufacturing process. The frames have been built using CNC machines from the CAD data. Modelling data for Prince of Wales and a modified design with a LNER Class V2-type pony truck, was released in early 2013. In April 2014, construction commenced at Scunthorpe Steelworks, where the frame plates were rolled and flame profiled.

Construction was expected to take seven years, and the A1 Trust projected that the cost will be £5 million.

Project milestones

References

External sites
Official website at P2 Steam

Standard gauge steam locomotives of Great Britain
Steam locomotives of the 21st century
Individual locomotives of Great Britain